Star Wars Galaxy may mean:

 Star Wars Galaxies, a Star Wars themed MMORPG platform for Microsoft Windows
 Star Wars Galaxies: The Ruins of Dantooine, 2003 science fiction novel
 Star Wars galaxy, the fictional galaxy where the setting of the Star Wars saga occurs
 Star Wars Galaxy (comic), a British comic series from Titan Comics